Shafiqa Quraishi  is an Afghan women's rights activist. As of 2010 she is a police colonel and the director of Gender, Human and Child Rights within the Ministry of the Interior of Afghanistan. She founded and led a working group on the Afghan National Gender Recruitment Strategy, with the goal of getting 5,000 women to work in the Ministry of the Interior and making the Ministry of the Interior better at serving the women of Afghanistan. She also worked for more benefits for working women such as child care, health care, maternity care, security and skills training. She managed to obtain promotions for women working in the Afghan National Police who had been unfairly passed over for years. As of 2011 she is Afghanistan's most senior policewoman.

Quraishi had her work disrupted during Taliban rule of Afghanistan from the mid-1990s until 2001.

She received a 2010 International Women of Courage award.

References

Living people
Afghan women activists
Afghan women's rights activists
Year of birth missing (living people)
Recipients of the International Women of Courage Award